Sir Clement James Harman, GBE (15 May 1894 – 15 September 1975) was Lord Mayor of London from 1963 to 1964.

References 
https://www.ukwhoswho.com/view/10.1093/ww/9780199540891.001.0001/ww-9780199540884-e-155335

1894 births
1975 deaths
Knights Grand Cross of the Order of the British Empire
20th-century lord mayors of London
Sheriffs of the City of London
British Army generals of World War I